Lago is a parish (administrative division) in Allande, a municipality within the province and autonomous community of Asturias, in northern Spain. 

The population is 26.

Villages and hamlets
 Armenande
 Carcedo
 Castaedo
 Llago
 Montefurao
 San Pedro
 El Villar
 Villardexusto

References

External links
 Allande 

Parishes in Allande